Hot Tomorrows is a 1977 film written and directed by Martin Brest. The film includes appearances from actor Hervé Villechaize and the theatre troupe The Mystic Knights of the Oingo Boingo, and is the only filmed example of a performance from the troupe apart from the film Forbidden Zone. Orson Welles provides the voice of a funeral home director.

Plot
A young New York City writer who has moved to Los Angeles spends his days exploring his obsession with death.

References

External links

1977 films
Films directed by Martin Brest
1977 comedy films
American student films
Films about death
1970s English-language films